Iwar Wiklander (born 30 May 1939) is a Swedish actor. He appeared in more than fifty films since 1963.

Selected filmography

References

External links 

1939 births
Living people
Swedish male film actors